Marcelle Praince (9 June 1882 – 26 October 1969) was a French actress.

Praince was born Célestine Cardi in Vigeois, Corrèze, France and died in Maisons-Laffitte, Yvelines.

Selected filmography
 Should We Wed Them? (1932)
 The Red Robe (1933)
 Sapho (1934)
 La Garçonne (1936)
 Parisian Life (1936)
 The Man of the Hour (1937)
 White Cargo (1937)
 Entence Cordiale (1939)
 The Fatted Calf (1939)
 A Cage of Nightingales (1945)
 Father Goriot (1945)
 Captain Blomet (1947)
 The Three Cousins (1947)
 The Mysterious Monsieur Sylvain (1947)
 Dilemma of Two Angels (1948)
 The Cupid Club (1949)
 Doctor Laennec (1949)
 The Girl from Maxim's (1950)
 Darling Caroline (1951)
 Two Pennies Worth of Violets (1951)
 Matrimonial Agency (1952)
 Madame du Barry (1954)
 Chaque jour a son secret (1958)

External links

1882 births
1969 deaths
French stage actresses
French film actresses
French silent film actresses
People from Corrèze
20th-century French actresses